Cassinia subtropica, commonly known as bushy rosemary, is a species of flowering plant in the family Asteraceae and is endemic to north-eastern Australia. It is shrub with woolly-hairy stems, lance-shaped to egg-shaped leaves and panicles of flower heads.

Description
The upper surface of the leaves is glabrous and the lower surface is covered with whitish to rust-coloured hairs.

Taxonomy and naming
Cassinia subtropica was first formally described in 1858 by Ferdinand von Mueller in Fragmenta phytographiae Australiae from specimens collected by Walter Hill.

Distribution
This cassinia grows in forest and on the edges of rainforest from north-east and central-eastern Queensland to far north-eastern New South Wales.

References

subtropica
Asterales of Australia
Flora of New South Wales
Flora of Queensland
Plants described in 1858
Taxa named by Ferdinand von Mueller